The Broad Street Line (BSL), also known as the Broad Street subway (BSS), Orange Line, or Broad Line, is a subway line owned by the city of Philadelphia and operated by the Southeastern Pennsylvania Transportation Authority (SEPTA). The line runs primarily north-south from the Fern Rock Transportation Center in North Philadelphia through Center City Philadelphia to NRG station at Pattison Avenue in South Philadelphia; the latter station provides access to the stadiums and arenas for the city's major professional sports teams at the South Philadelphia Sports Complex, about a quarter mile away.  It is named for Broad Street, under which the line runs for almost its entire length.

The line, which is entirely underground except for the northern terminus at Fern Rock, has four tracks in a local/express configuration from Fern Rock to Walnut-Locust and two tracks from Lombard-South to the southern terminus at NRG station.  It is one of only two rapid transit lines in the SEPTA system overall alongside the Market–Frankford Line, though Center City Philadelphia is also served by four stations of the PATCO Speedline rapid transit line which runs between downtown Philadelphia through Camden, New Jersey to Lindenwold, New Jersey. With about 115,000 boardings on an average weekday, it is the second busiest route in the SEPTA system.

The line and its trains were leased to SEPTA in 1968 after it assumed operation of the city transit systems from the former Philadelphia Transportation Company (PTC). Broad Street Line subway cars bear both the SEPTA logo and the seal of the City of Philadelphia to reflect the split ownership-operation arrangement.

History

Service on the northern half of the Broad Street Line, between City Hall and Olney Avenue, opened on September 1, 1928. While the original subway tunnel had been finished to just north of the present-day Lombard-South station, service to the Walnut-Locust station did not begin until 1930, and the Lombard-South station entered service in 1932. Service from that point south to Snyder Avenue began on September 18, 1938.  Service to a new park-and-ride station built next to the Fern Rock shops began in 1956, and the line was extended further south to Pattison Avenue in 1973 to serve the recently completed Sports Complex.

The total cost of the original segment, "Olney Avenue to South Street," was stated at $102 million.

Although the Broad Street Line was originally planned in the 1920s to be a 4-track facility for its entire length (Fern Rock portal to Snyder), the tunnel was built with provision for 4 tracks only from the portal to just north of Lombard-South. At the time of opening, the outer 2 tracks were built along this length, whereas the inner 2 express tracks were built only in two sections, from the Fern Rock portal/shops to just south of Olney, and from Girard to their terminus just north of Lombard South. To close the gaps, the two inner express tracks were laid from Erie to Girard in 1959, and again from Olney to Erie in 1991.

From Lombard-South station south to Snyder, the tunnel was constructed differently – only the eastern half of the line was built. The track currently used for southbound trains is actually the northbound express track. The extension in 1973 to Pattison station (now called NRG station) continued this arrangement. Space exists under the western half of Broad Street for the construction of the western half of the tunnel, which would include the remaining 2 tracks and additional island platforms for southbound local and express trains. The resulting infrastructure would match the configuration built in the northern half of the line.

Provisions for flying junctions exist in the tunnels at three locations: north of Olney station, north of Erie station, and between Tasker-Morris and Snyder stations. These were to connect to planned but never built extensions to the north, northeast, northwest and southwest. Tracks were laid in the upper levels of the flying junctions north of Olney and Erie; these have been used over the years to store out-of-service trains and as layover points for express and Ridge Spur trains.

The NRG Station contains a lower level platform (but very narrow compared to the very wide upper level platform), built to accommodate additional trains for large crowds at sporting events. Seldom used in recent years, these tracks are most often used to store rolling stock and work trains.  Two of the Broad Street subway system's stations have been closed: Spring Garden station (closed in 1991) on the Ridge Avenue spur line and Franklin Square station on the PATCO route (closed in 1953 and later opened in 1976 for Bi-Centennial and then closed again in 1979).

The Broad Street Line is one of only two rapid transit lines in the United States outside of New York City to use separate local and express tracks for a significant length, the other being Chicago's North Side Main Line from Armitage north, used by Purple Line express trains.

During early 2020, the line operated "Lifeline Service" due to the COVID-19 pandemic in Pennsylvania. All stations were reopened by July 2020.

In September 2021, SEPTA proposed updating wayfinding across the SEPTA Rail Transit network. Part of the proposal, SEPTA proposed rebranding their rail transit service as "SEPTA Metro", in order to make the system easier to navigate. Under this proposal, services along the Broad Street Line will be rebranded as the "B" lines with an orange color. Each service utilizing the trunk would receive a numeric suffix. Local service would be known as the B1 Broad Street Local, the express and special service as the B2 Broad Street Express and B2 Express Sport Special, and the Broad–Ridge Spur as the B3 Broad–Ridge Express.

Following public feedback, SEPTA revised the Wayfinding Master Plan. Rather than being referred to as the B Lines, the current Broad Street Line would become the B Line. Express and special services would be consolidated into the B2 Broad Street Express, with signage letting riders know whether a train terminates at Walnut–Locust or NRG station. Additionally, SEPTA stated they would pilot neighborhood maps in stations and prioritize the deployment of real-time information signage and on mobile apps.

Proposed extensions

Roosevelt Boulevard

Both the City of Philadelphia and SEPTA have studied extending the Broad Street Line along Roosevelt Boulevard, in order to serve a growing population in the northeast section of the city. The city government's archives contain a survey report, prepared in 1948, discussing a need for an extension of the Broad Street line from Erie Avenue to the vicinity of Pennypack Circle (see Roosevelt Boulevard). Subway car destination signage even included station and terminus names for major streets along Roosevelt Boulevard such as Rhawn Street, in the newer "South Broad" cars. An expansion into another part of the City could better use the capacity of the four-track trunk line.

In 1964, the city proposed a nine-mile (14 km), $94 million extension of the Broad Street line along Roosevelt Blvd. in conjunction with a new Northeast Expressway to be built by the Pennsylvania Department of Transportation. Development was limited to the building of one subway station by Sears, Roebuck and Company in 1967, at its complex on Roosevelt Boulevard at Adams Avenue, at the cost of $1 million, in anticipation of future service. This station was destroyed when the facility was demolished in October 1994. Ultimately the Northeast Expressway was never built, due to lack of funds, and the subway extension remained a paper concept.

On September 10, 1999, SEPTA filed a Notice of Intent to prepare an Environmental Impact Statement for the Northeast Extension with the EPA. In December 2001, the Philadelphia City Planning Commission supported extending the Broad Street Line along Roosevelt Blvd. to Bustleton Avenue, where it would be joined by the Market–Frankford Line, extended from its Frankford terminal (now the rebuilt Frankford Transportation Center). The estimated cost had ballooned to $3.4 billion.

Philadelphia Naval Yard
Currently, the Broad Street Line terminates southbound at NRG station at Pattison Avenue and three major stadiums. With the redevelopment of the Philadelphia Naval Yard directly to the south, a Health Impact Assessment report was issued in March of 2012 to determine if extending the line to the Naval Yard would be a viable option for commuters. It determined that extending the line to the Naval Yard would more than halve the number of private cars commuting back and forth, with the remainder taking the proposed subway line and/or using a bicycle sidepath. The HIA recommends making an extension of the Broad Street Line a priority, and recently, the extension has garnered much support.

West Philadelphia
A report in the 1940s proposed an extension of the Locust St. subway to West Philadelphia.  This line would have run under one of the streets presently served by the subway-surface system.  Presumably, the current subway-surface lines would have been converted to bus operation and would have been used to feed this line.  It appears that this proposal was replaced by the extension of the subway portion of the subway-surface system in the 1950s.

Northwest
The same report also proposed a northwest extension.  This would have branched off at the North Philadelphia station and would have taken over the Pennsylvania Railroad's Chestnut Hill Branch which is still operated today as part of the SEPTA Regional Rail system as the Chestnut Hill West Line.

Operation

Rolling stock

The first set of rail cars for the Broad Street subway was the B-1 cars built in 1926–27 by the J.G. Brill Company.  The Pressed Steel Car Company supplied an additional set in 1938 collectively known as the B-2's. The JG Brill Company also built and delivered 26 deluxe art-deco streamlined subway cars to the Delaware River Joint Commission in early 1936 for use on its Bridge Line from 8th and Market into Camden, NJ via the Benjamin Franklin Bridge. These cars were designed to be compatible with the other Broad Street cars, and could run in multiple with them. After the Bridge Line became part of the PATCO Lindenwold Hi-Speedline in late 1968, 23 of these former "Bridge Line" cars were sold to the City of Philadelphia in 1969 to be used on the Broad Street subway, and were designated as the B-3's, until they were retired by early 1984.

The first set has had the second longest lifespan of any subway car in Philadelphia, after that of the Market Street cars built for what ultimately became the Market–Frankford Line.  Although the line was a host for the UMTA's State of the Art Car program, real replacements for the Broad Street cars did not come until late 1982, when SEPTA introduced new "B-IV" cars built by Kawasaki, which are currently the only cars operating the line. The cars are 67ft 6in long, 10ft 1.5in wide, and 12ft 3in tall.

Preservation 

 A small number of B-1, B-2, and B-3 historic cars remain stored in derelict condition within Fern Rock yard.
 One B-1 car was sent and sold to the Trackside Brick Oven Pizzeria in Wallingford, Connecticut.
 One B-1 car (#55) is present at the Illinois Railway Museum.
 One B-3 car (#1009) is partially restored at the Rockhill Trolley Museum.
 Two B-3 cars (#1018, #1023) are at the Seashore Trolley Museum.

Service

Four different services run along the Broad Street Line:
Local (L) – trains show white marker lights; stops at all stations
Express (E) – trains show green marker lights; stops at select stations between Fern Rock and Walnut–Locust weekdays only
Broad–Ridge Spur (R) – trains show yellow marker lights; features service via Ridge Ave to 8th & Market from Monday-Saturday
Special (S) – trains show blue marker lights; features service from all express stations to/from NRG Station for sporting and entertainment events

Panel indicators

The Kawasaki B-IV cars feature multi-panel signs to indicate the origin point, destination, and type of service. One sign is mounted on each side of a car, set just inside a window to make it visible from both the interior and exterior. A similar, smaller sign is mounted over car-end doors when cab equipment is present; this sign is only visible from the exterior. These signs were a significant improvement over earlier rolling stock which completely lacked such signage.

Each sign consists of a set of 12 panels arranged in 4 rows of 3 columns each (a 3 x 4 grid). Each panel can be illuminated by an incandescent light bulb. As shown above, the upper three rows indicate station names while the bottom row indicates type of service. Trains normally light three panels: two station names (origin and destination) and a type of service (local, express, or special). Only significant stations are represented in the grid.

In 1982, following delivery of the first significant number of B-IV cars, SEPTA assigned these cars to the restoration of express service. The signs were lit to show "OLNEY" "WALNUT" "EXPRESS". In early 1983, with more B-IV cars arriving and placed into local service, signs showed "FERN ROCK" "PATTISON" "LOCAL". After delivery of the last cars, Broad–Ridge Spur trains showed "ERIE" "8th-MARKET" (rush hour) or "GIRARD" "8th-MARKET" (off-peak and weekends). Special trains showed "FERN ROCK" "PATTISON" "SPECIAL" "EXPRESS". Subsequent changes to express and Broad–Ridge Spur service patterns led to the current signage: express trains show "FERN ROCK" "WALNUT" "EXPRESS" and Broad–Ridge trains show "OLNEY" "8th-MARKET" "EXPRESS" (weekdays) and "FERN ROCK" "8th-MARKET" "EXPRESS" (weekends). In 2010, with the renaming of the terminal, all signs were updated with "AT&T" in place of "PATTISON", and again with "NRG" replacing "AT&T" in 2018.

Operating times and headways
 

A local trip along the entire line takes about 35 minutes.  Trains run from approximately 5:00 am to 1:00 am, with a timed-transfer at 12:30 am at City Hall station to connect with the Market Frankford Line based on final trains. The Broad Street Owl bus service replaces the subway throughout the night Monday through Friday mornings, stopping at the same locations as the subway trains.  The line itself ran 24 hours a day until it was eliminated in 1991; it was reinstated on June 20, 2014 for Friday and Saturday overnights only on a trial basis. It was made permanent on October 8, 2014 due to the line successfully carrying an extra 10,000 riders on the Broad Street Line during the weekend overnight periods. This was eliminated again in 2020 due to the COVID-19 Pandemic. 

The local portion of the Broad Street Line carries a headway of eight minutes or less during the daytime all day weekdays, 10–12 minutes all day on weekends and major holidays, and 12 minutes in the evenings.  Weekend night service consists of a 20-minute frequency, while owl bus service early weekday mornings utilize a 15-minute frequency.  The express portion of the line ranges from seven minutes during peak hours to 12 minutes off-peak, while the Broad Ridge Spur ranges from seven minutes during peak hours to 20 minutes off-peak.

Broad–Ridge Spur

A two-track spur of the Broad Street Line, known as the Broad–Ridge Spur, diverges from the main line at Fairmount. Originally known as the Ridge–8th Street subway, the line follows Ridge Avenue, southeastward from the intersection of Broad Street, Ridge and Fairmount Avenues to a two-level junction beneath 8th and Race Streets, where tunnels leading to and from the Benjamin Franklin Bridge to Camden connect to it, then proceeds south under 8th Street. At its southern terminus at 8th and Market streets, passengers may transfer to the Market–Frankford Line and the PATCO Speedline. The spur operates Mondays through Saturdays from 6 am to 9 pm, running two-car trains (though platforms can fit five cars).

Ridge Spur service to 8th and Market streets began on December 21, 1932.  As part of that project, a tunnel shell running south under 8th Street then west under Locust Street to 18th Street (reusing parts of the never-completed Center City loop constructed in 1917) was completed in 1933 but not outfitted for service. Bridge Line service from 8th and Market to Camden began on June 7, 1936, sharing the Ridge Spur platforms at 8th and Market and splitting off from the Ridge Spur just south of Chinatown station. 

Beginning in June 1949, Ridge Spur and Bridge Line trains were through-routed at 8th and Market. The unused Locust Street tunnel was completed on February 15, 1953; Bridge Line trains were extended to a new terminus at 15th–16th Street station with two intermediate stops, while Ridge Spur trains reverted to running between 8th Street and Girard. In January 1954, due to low ridership, off-peak service and Saturday again began operating between Girard and Camden, with a shuttle train operating between 8th and 16th stations. Sunday service was suspended at that time due to minimal usage. Ridge Spur service was suspended from August 23 to 27, 1968, as tracks were switched to a new upper-level terminal platform at 8th Street station to allow conversion of the 8th–Locust Street subway into the Lindenwold High-Speed Line (PATCO Speedline).

The Ridge Spur was closed from February 1981 to September 6, 1983, during construction of the Center City Commuter Connection. Spring Garden station, by then exit-only, was closed on September 10, 1989, due to safety concerns. Never drawing high ridership, the spur has been proposed for closure on several occasions. The 2014 closure of the Gallery Mall, adjacent to 8th and Market station, caused ridership on the spur to drop by 25%.

Stations
All stations are located in the city of Philadelphia, Pennsylvania. Stations on the Broad–Ridge Spur are shaded in gold. Special extra service for sports and entertainment events make all express stops between Fern Rock to Walnut–Locust and then continue express to NRG.

Services

References

External links

Broad Street Line on SEPTA website
World.nycsubway.org: Philadelphia: SEPTA Broad Street Subway

 
Railway lines opened in 1928
Underground rapid transit in the United States
Standard gauge railways in the United States
600 V DC railway electrification